Gheorghe Pahonțu (17 July 1933 - 19 october 1991) was a Romanian football right defender and manager.

International career
Gheorghe Pahonțu played four friendly games at international level for Romania, making his debut in a 1–0 victory against Norway.

Honours

Player
Petrolul Ploiești
Divizia A: 1957–58, 1958–59, 1965–66
Divizia B: 1953
Cupa României: 1962–63, runner-up 1952

Notes

References

External links

Gheorghe Pahonțu at Labtof.ro

1933 births
1991 deaths
Romanian footballers
Romania international footballers
Association football defenders
Liga I players
Liga II players
FC Petrolul Ploiești players
Romanian football managers
Sportspeople from Ploiești